Magpakailanman (English: Forevermore) is a weekly drama anthology broadcast by GMA Network. The show is hosted by 24 Oras anchor and GMA Kapuso Foundation founder Mel Tiangco and features inspiring stories and life experiences from both famous and ordinary people. It airs every Saturday on the network's primetime block.

The following are the lists of Magpakailanman episodes listed by the year they were aired, from the first and second incarnation.

Series overview

Episode list

First incarnation

2003

2004

2005

2006

Second incarnation

2012

2013

2014

2015

2016

2017

2018

2019

2020

2021

2022

2023

References

Lists of anthology television series episodes
Lists of Philippine drama television series episodes